Jinlong Temple is a Buddhist temple located in Mengjiao Township of Cangyuan Va Autonomous County, Yunnan, China.

History
Jinlong Temple was first established in 1380, at the dawn of Ming dynasty (1368–1644), the modern temple was founded in 1980. Jinlong Temple was completely destroyed by the Red Guards in the ten-year Cultural Revolution. On November 6, 1988, Jinlong Temple was devastated by a catastrophic earthquake. The Main Hall was rebuilt in 2001 and the Shanmen was rebuilt in 2015.

Architecture

Abbot
The current abbot is Tikadaxi. He is the managing director of the China Buddhist Association and vice-president of Yunnan Buddhist Association.

References

Buddhist temples in Yunnan
Buildings and structures in Lincang
Tourist attractions in Lincang
20th-century establishments in China
20th-century Buddhist temples
Religious buildings and structures completed in 1980